Alexandru IV Lăpușneanu (1499 – 5 May 1568) was Ruler of Moldavia between September 1552 and 18 November 1561 and then between October 1564 and 5 May 1568. He was the son of Bogdan III the One-Eyed. His wife and consort was Doamna Ruxanda Lăpușneanu, the daughter of Peter IV Rareș and Princess Elena Ecaterina Rareș (the second daughter of Jovan Branković of Serbia). He was the original founder of the Dormition Church, Lviv, also commonly known as the Wallachian Church. His son Bogdan IV of Moldavia ruled 1568–1572.

The writer Constantin Negruzzi wrote the short story Alexandru Lăpușneanu in 1857 based on the ruler's life; it was turned into an opera by Alexandru Zirra.

References 

Rulers of Moldavia
1499 births
1568 deaths
House of Bogdan-Mușat